The 1995 Italian Superturismo Championship was the ninth edition of the Italian Superturismo Championship. The season began in Misano on 23 April and finished in Vallelunga on 8 October, after ten rounds. Emanuele Pirro won the championship, driving an Audi A4 Quattro; the German manufacturer won the constructors' championship, while Mauro Trione won the privateers' trophy.

Teams and drivers

Race calendar and results

Championship standings

 18 results from 20 are valid for the championship

Drivers' Championship

Manufacturers' Trophy

Privateers' Championship

External links
1995 Drivers List
1995 Standings

Italian Superturismo Championship